Khafkuiyeh (also Romanized as Khāfkū‘īyeh; also known as Khafgoo’eyeh, Khāfkū, Khāf Kūh, Khānkū, and Khvāfkūh) is a village in Bezenjan Rural District, in the Central District of Baft County, Kerman Province, Iran. At the 2006 census, its population was 161, in 46 families.

References 

Populated places in Baft County